Crocota niveata is a moth of the family Geometridae. It is found in Austria and Romania.

The wingspan is 26–30 mm for males and 23–26 mm for females. Adults are on wing in June and July.

References

External links

Lepiforum.de

Moths described in 1763
Boarmiini
Moths of Europe
Taxa named by Giovanni Antonio Scopoli